"Smack Jack" is a song by German singer Nina Hagen released in 1982 by CBS Records as a lead single from her debut solo album NunSexMonkRock. It deals with a drug addiction and is actually written by Hagen's Dutch ex-boyfriend and father of her daughter Cosma Shiva, Ferdinand "Ferdi" Karmelk, who was a heroin addict and later died of AIDS in 1988. It is Hagen's second song addressing this theme after her 1979 song "Herrmann Hiess Er", which is believed to be about her ex-boyfriend Herman Brood. The music video for the song shows Hagen dressed as a man with two of her other transformations dancing in the background and singing the chorus.

Track listings
7" single (Europe)
"Smack Jack" – 3:28
"Cosma Shiva" – 3:15

12" single (Europe)
"Smack Jack" – 5:10
"Cosma Shiva" – 3:15

12" promo single (US)
"Smack Jack" – 5:14
"Cosma Shiva" – 3:20
"Born In Xixax" – 2:55

References

External links

1982 singles
Nina Hagen songs
Songs about drugs
1982 songs
CBS Records singles
Song recordings produced by Mike Thorne